The men's 3000 metres steeplechase at the 2013 World Championships in Athletics was held at the Luzhniki Stadium on 12 and 15 August.

The final was, as expected, led by the Kenyan team.  With multiple Olympic and returning World Champion Ezekiel Kemboi, they were at the front with the rest of the field strung out behind them.  For the first four laps, Conseslus Kipruto did the majority of the leading, with the rest of the Kenyans, then both Ugandans behind.  Occasionally Mahiedine Mekhissi-Benabbad would pass one of the Ugandan athletes.  With three laps to go, things began to shake up.  Paul Kipsiele Koech moved into the lead and at about the same time Noureddine Smaïl moved from the middle of the pack along the outside into third place.  As the pace quickened, the Ugandans disappeared, replaced by the two Frenchmen and Evan Jager as contenders behind the Kenyan gauntlet.  Over the next half lap, the pace quickened, Smai'l disappeared and Matthew Hughes of Canada emerged. Going into the last lap, Conseslus Kipruto and Koech were in the lead with Kemboi behind them followed by Mekhissi and Jager.  Menkhissi moved along the outside, with about 200 meters to go, passed Kemboi, then Koech and was even with Kipruto.  But behind him, Kemboi moved into a different gear.  Taking the barrier at the end of the straight in full hurdle stride, in the next 50 meters before the water jump, Kemboi went around the outside and took the lead.  Mekhissi was next over the water jump with Kipruto scrambling to make up ground.  In full sprint, Kipruto went around Mekhissi but didn't negotiate the last barrier as well as Kemboi.  Regaining his balance he again sprinted making up significant ground on his more experienced teammate, but it was not enough to get gold.  Make that three straight for Kemboi, along with two Olympic gold medals unbeaten in the World Championships since he finished second to a different Kipruto in 2007.  In all, three golds, three silvers and nothing worse in the World Championships since 2003.  Mekhissi repeats his bronze medal.

Records
Prior to the competition, the records were as follows:

Qualification standards

Schedule

Results

Heats
Qualification: First 3 in each heat (Q) and the next 6 fastest (q) advanced to the final.

Final
The final was started at 20:20.

References

External links
3000 metres steeplechase results at IAAF website

steeplechase
Steeplechase at the World Athletics Championships